Buin in Iran may refer to:
 Buin, Gilan
 Buin va Miandasht
 Buin Zahra
 Buin-e Olya, Kurdistan Province
 Buin-e Sofla, Kurdistan Province
 Buin, Zanjan
 Buin Rural District, in Kurdistan Province